Wei Xiong is a Chinese economist currently the John H. Scully '66 Professor in Finance and Professor of Economics at Princeton University.

Education
In 1993, Xiong received his B.S. in physics from the University of Science and Technology of China. He then received his M.A. in physics from Columbia University in 1995 and his Ph.D. in finance from Duke University in 2001.

References

Year of birth missing (living people)
Living people
Princeton University faculty
Chinese economists